Startup is a census-designated place (CDP) in Snohomish County, Washington, United States. The population was 676 at the 2010 census.

History
Startup was homesteaded by F.M. Sparling in the 1880s.  In 1890 William Wait laid out a townsite which he called Wallace, but this caused confusion with mail being missent to Wallace, Idaho, and in 1901 the name was changed to Startup to honor George G. Startup, manager of the Wallace Lumber Company.

The Startup post office was established in 1900.

Geography
According to the United States Census Bureau, Startup has a total area of 4.0 square miles (10.3 km2), of which 3.9 square miles (10.1 km2) is land and 0.1 square miles (0.2 km2) (2.01%) water.  It is located on U.S. Route 2 26.4 miles east of Everett.

Climate
The climate in this area has mild differences between highs and lows, and there is adequate rainfall year-round.  According to the Köppen Climate Classification system, Startup has a marine west coast climate, abbreviated "Cfb" on climate maps.

Population
As of the census of 2000, there were 817 people, 332 households, and 227 families residing in the CDP. The population density was 209.2 people per square mile (80.7/km2). There were 356 housing units at an average density of 91.2/sq mi (35.2/km2). The racial makeup of the CDP was 89.84% White, 0.37% African American, 2.69% Native American, 1.59% Asian, 2.69% from other races, and 2.82% from two or more races. Hispanic or Latino of any race were 4.16% of the population.

There were 332 households, out of which 24.4% had children under the age of 18 living with them, 49.1% were married couples living together, 10.2% had a female householder with no husband present, and 31.6% were non-families. 25.9% of all households were made up of individuals, and 7.8% had someone living alone who was 65 years of age or older. The average household size was 2.46 and the average family size was 2.89.

In the CDP, the age distribution of the population shows 22.8% under the age of 18, 7.3% from 18 to 24, 29.1% from 25 to 44, 25.8% from 45 to 64, and 14.9% who were 65 years of age or older. The median age was 39 years. For every 100 females, there were 112.8 males. For every 100 females age 18 and over, there were 114.6 males.

The median income for a household in the CDP was $40,227, and the median income for a family was $45,000. Males had a median income of $42,250 versus $21,367 for females. The per capita income for the CDP was $18,049. About 9.9% of families and 13.6% of the population were below the poverty line, including 27.5% of those under age 18 and 15.8% of those age 65 or over.

References

Census-designated places in Snohomish County, Washington
Census-designated places in Washington (state)